Rodney Lulamile Malamba (born 11 March 1966 in Langa, Cape Town, Cape Province) is a former South African first-class cricketer who played for Natal from 1988 to 1991.

Malamba was a right-arm fast-medium bowler and right-handed tail-end batsman. His best first-class bowling figures were 3 for 64 and 4 for 21 for Natal B against Northern Transvaal in 1991–92.

He was the first black cricketer to play in the Currie Cup. His father, Ben Malamba, was an all-rounder who was one of the leading black cricketers of the apartheid era in South Africa.

He runs a cricket academy in Durban. In February 2020, he was named in South Africa's squad for the Over-50s Cricket World Cup in South Africa. However, the tournament was cancelled during the third round of matches due to the coronavirus pandemic.

References

External links
 
 

1966 births
Living people
South African cricketers
KwaZulu-Natal cricketers
South African cricket coaches
Sportspeople from Cape Town
People from the City of Cape Town